United States gubernatorial elections were held in 1902, in 27 states, concurrent with the House and Senate elections, on November 4, 1902 (except in Arkansas, Georgia, Maine, Oregon and Vermont, which held early elections).

In Alabama, the governor was elected to a four-year term for the first time, instead of a two-year term. The election was held on the same day as federal elections for the first time, having previously been held in August.

Results

See also 
1902 United States elections

References

Notes 

 
November 1902 events